Scratchcratchratchatch is the debut mixtape of turntablist Kid Koala. There were reports of only 500 copies released initially, but it was picked up by Ninja Tune records. They continue to sell it in its original format as a cassette tape.  Due to heavy use of unlicensed samples, the cassette has a label with 'for promotional use only' printed on it.

Track listing
Side A:
 "Start Hear"
 "Emperors Crash Course In Cantonese"
 "Tubanjo"
 "The Prank Call"
 "Dinner With Yoda"
 "Statics Waltz (Lo-Fi Version)"
 "Tricks N' Treats"
 "Made From Björk"

Side B:
 "Made From Scratch"
 "Capone's Theme Park"
 "Fashion Lesson"
 "Medieval Retrowax"
 "Jhaptal"
 "Taboo Soda"
 "Almost Easy Listening"
 "The Mushroom Factory"
 "Thank You, Good Night, Drive Safely"

References
  Discogs "Kid Koala  - Scratchcratchratchatch."

External links 
 Album at Ninja Tune

Kid Koala albums
Mixtape albums
1996 compilation albums
Ninja Tune compilation albums